Chaboillez Square is a town square located in Montreal, Quebec, Canada. It is located at the intersection of Saint Jacques Street and Peel Street in downtown Montreal. The former Montreal Planetarium is located within the square.

History

In 1813, Margaret Godfrey inherited a large tract of land from her husband, Louis Chaboillez. She yielded many plots of land to the City of Montreal including the lot known as Chaboillez Square (which was larger than it is today).

The Square was completely refurbished in 1950 and reopened in 1953. Its size was reduced in the mid-1960s in planning for the coming of the Ville Marie Expressway. The Dow Planetarium (now known as Montreal Planetarium) was constructed in the square in 1966.

Monuments
The square used to display two monuments:
 Nicolaus Copernicus Statue (1967) by Bertel Thorvaldsen
 Sundial (1968), by Herman J. van der Heide
When the Rio Tinto Alcan Planetarium was opened near the Olympic Stadium to replace the Montreal Planetarium, both monuments were moved near the new planetarium.

Further reading
 Ville de Montréal, Les rues de Montréal, Répertoire historique. Éditions du Méridien. 1995.
 Sur la Loi du Square Chaboillez

Downtown Montreal
Squares in Montreal